My Chemical Romance is an American alternative rock band formed in New Jersey in 2001. The band released four studio albums: I Brought You My Bullets, You Brought Me Your Love (2002), Three Cheers for Sweet Revenge (2004), The Black Parade (2006), Danger Days: The True Lives of the Fabulous Killjoys (2010), and the compilation series Conventional Weapons (2013).

American Music Awards
The American Music Awards is an annual awards ceremony created by Dick Clark in 1973. My Chemical Romance have received one nomination.

|-
|align="center" | 2007 || My Chemical Romance || Favorite Alternative Artist || 
|-

Do Something Awards
Broadcast for the first time in 2007 by VH1, the Do Something Awards is the only national awards ceremony for social action. My Chemical Romance have received one nomination.

|-
|align="center"|2011||"#SINGItForJapan"||Charity Song||
|-

Grammy Awards
The Grammy Awards is an annual music awards show, presented by  National Academy of Recording Arts and Sciences. My Chemical Romance have received one nomination.

|-
|align="center" | 2008 || The Black Parade || Best Boxed or Special Limited Edition Package || 
|-

Kerrang! Awards
The Kerrang! Awards are awarded annually by British music magazine Kerrang!. My Chemical Romance have received six awards from eighteen nominations.

|-
|align="center" | 2004 || My Chemical Romance || Best International Newcomer || 
|-
|align="center" rowspan="4" | 2005 || My Chemical Romance || Best Band on the Planet || 
|-
|Three Cheers for Sweet Revenge || Best Album || 
|-
|"I'm Not Okay (I Promise) || Best Single || 
|-
|"Helena" || Best Video || 
|-
|align="center" | 2006 || My Chemical Romance || Best Band on the Planet || 
|-
|align="center" rowspan="4" | 2007 || My Chemical Romance || Best International Band || 
|-
|The Black Parade || Best Album || 
|-
|rowspan="2" |"Welcome to the Black Parade" || Best Single || 
|-
||Best Video || 
|-
|align="center" |2008|| My Chemical Romance || Best International Band || 
|-
|align="center" rowspan="5" | 2011 ||rowspan="2" | My Chemical Romance || Best International Band || 
|-
|Best Live Band || 
|-
|Danger Days: The True Lives of the Fabulous Killjoys || Best Album || 
|-
|"Na Na Na (Na Na Na Na Na Na Na Na Na)" || Best Video || 
|-
|"Planetary (Go!)" || Best Single || 
|-
|align="center" rowspan="2" | 2012 ||rowspan="2" | My Chemical Romance || Best International Band || 
|-
|Best Live Band ||

Metal Hammer Awards
The Metal Hammer Golden Gods Awards is an annual awards ceremony held by the British heavy metal magazine Metal Hammer. My Chemical Romance have received three nominations.

|-
|align="center"|2006||"The Ghost of You"||Best Video||
|-
|align="center" rowspan="2"|2007||The Black Parade||Album of the Year||
|-
|"Welcome to the Black Parade"||Best Video||
|-

MTV Awards

Los Premios MTV Latinoamérica
Los Premios MTV Latinoamérica, previously known as MTV Video Music Awards Latinoamérica, was Latin America's version of the MTV Video Music Awards. They were established in 2002 to honour the year's best in music and music videos. My Chemical Romance have won three awards from three nominations.

|-
|align="center" | 2005 ||My Chemical Romance || Best New Artist - International || 
|-
|align="center" | 2006 || My Chemical Romance || Best Rock Artist - International || 
|-
|align="center" | 2007 || My Chemical Romance || Best Rock Artist - International || 
|-

MTV Asia Awards
The MTV Asia Awards is a biannual awards show established in 2002, presented by MTV Asia. My Chemical Romance have received two awards out of three nominations.

|-
|align="center" rowspan="3"|2006||rowspan="2"|My Chemical Romance||Favorite Rock Act||
|-
|Favorite Breakthrough Artist||
|-
||"Helena"||Favorite Video||
|-

MTV Australia Awards
The MTV Australia Awards, previously known as the MTV Australia Video Music Awards is an annual awards ceremony founded in 2005 as Australia's first awards show celebrating both international and local acts. My Chemical Romance have received two nominations.

|-
|align="center" rowspan="2" | 2007 || rowspan="2"|"Welcome to the Black Parade" || Best Rock Video || 
|-
| Video of the Year || 
|-

MTV Europe Music Awards
The MTV Europe Music Awards is an annual awards ceremony established in 1994 by MTV Europe. My Chemical Romance have received five nominations.

|-
|align="center" rowspan="3" | 2007 || rowspan="3"|My Chemical Romance || Best Band || 
|-
|Best Inter Act || 
|-
|Rock Out || 
|-
|align="center" rowspan="2" | 2011 || rowspan="2"|My Chemical Romance || Best Alternative Band || 
|-
|Best World Stage Performance || 
|-

MTV Video Music Awards
The MTV Video Music Awards is an annual awards show honouring the year's best music videos. My Chemical Romance have received five nominations.

|-
|align="center" rowspan="5" | 2005 || rowspan="5"|"Helena" || MTV2 Award || 
|-
|Best Rock Video || 
|-
|Best New Artist in a Video || 
|-
|Best Choreography in a Video || 
|- 
|Viewer's Choice || 
|-

MTV Video Music Awards Japan
The MTV Video Music Awards Japan were established in 2002 and presented by MTV Japan, and are the Japanese version of the MTV Video Music Awards. My Chemical Romance have won two awards from two nominations.

|-
|align="center" rowspan="2"|2007||rowspan="2"|"Welcome to the Black Parade"||Best Rock Video||
|-
|Best Group Video||
|-

mtvU Woodie Awards
The Woodie Awards is the annual awards show of mtvU, a division of Viacom's MTV Networks. My Chemical Romance have won one award from three nominations.

|-
|align="center" rowspan="3" | 2005 || My Chemical Romance || Woodie of the Year (Artist of the Year) || 
|-
||"Helena" || Best Video Woodie - Live Action (Best Live Action Video) || 
|-
||"I'm Not Okay (I Promise)" || Streaming Woodie (Most Downloaded) || 
|-

MuchMusic Video Awards
The MuchMusic Video Awards are annual awards presented by Canadian video channel MuchMusic to honour the year's best music videos. My Chemical Romance have won two awards from three nominations.

|-
|align="center" | 2005 || "Helena" || Best International Group Video || 
|-
|align="center" rowspan="2" | 2007 || My Chemical Romance || People's Choice: Favorite International Group || 
|-
||"Welcome to the Black Parade" || Best International Group Video || 
|-

Music Video Production Association Awards
These annual awards have been held by the Music Video Production Association since 1992, and honour the best music videos in a variety of aspects. My Chemical Romance have won five awards from eleven nominations.

|-
|align="center" rowspan="2"|2005||rowspan="2"|"I'm Not Okay (I Promise)"||Best Alternative||
|-
|Best Direction of a New Artist||
|-
|align="center" rowspan="7"|2006||rowspan="3"|"Helena"||Best Choreography||
|-
|Best Colorist/Telecine||
|-
|Best Styling||
|-
|rowspan="4"|"The Ghost of You"||Best Art Direction||
|-
|Best Styling||
|-
|Best Hair||
|-
|Best Make-up||
|-
|align="center" rowspan="2"|2007||rowspan="2"|"Welcome to the Black Parade"||Best Colorist/Telecine||
|-
|Best Styling||
|-

NME Awards

NME Awards USA
My Chemical Romance have won one award from three nominations.

|-
|align="center" rowspan="3" | 2008 || rowspan="2"|My Chemical Romance || Best Live Band || 
|-
|Best Band || 
|-
||"Teenagers" || Best Track || 
|-

NME Awards
The NME Awards is an annual music awards show, founded by the British music magazine NME (New Musical Express). My Chemical Romance have won three awards from twelve nominations.

My Chemical Romance performed at the 2011 NME Awards, playing "Vampire Money" and "Na Na Na (Na Na Na Na Na Na Na Na Na)".

|-
|align="center" rowspan="4"|2007||rowspan="2"|My Chemical Romance||Best International Band||
|-
|Best Live Band||
|-
||The Black Parade||Best Album||
|-
||Life on the Murder Scene||Best Music DVD||
|-
|align="center" rowspan="3"|2008||rowspan="2"|My Chemical Romance||Best International Band||
|-
|Best Live Band||
|-
||"Teenagers"||Best Video||
|-
|align="center" rowspan="4" |2011||My Chemical Romance||Best International Band||
|-
|rowspan="2"|Danger Days: The True Lives of the Fabulous Killjoys||Best Album||
|-
|Best Album Artwork||
|-
||"Na Na Na (Na Na Na Na Na Na Na Na Na)"||Best Video||
|-
|align="center" rowspan="2"|2012||My Chemical Romance and Brian May at Reading Festival 2011||Greatest Music Moment of the Year||
|-
|My Chemical Romance
|Most Dedicated Fans
|

Scream Awards
The Scream Awards is an annual awards show dedicated to the horror, science-fiction, and fantasy genres of feature films. My Chemical Romance have received one nomination.

|-
|align="center"|2009||"Desolation Row"||Scream Song of the Year||
|-

Teen Choice Awards
The Teen Choice Awards is an annual awards show airing on Fox cable channel. My Chemical Romance have received one nomination.

|-
|align="center"|2011||"Sing"||Choice Music: Rock Track||
|-

TMF Awards
The annual Belgian TMF Awards is an annual awards show broadcast live on TMF (The Music Factory). My Chemical Romance have received three nominations.

|-
|align="center" rowspan="3"|2007||rowspan="2"|My Chemical Romance||Best International Rock||
|-
|Best International Alternative||
|-
||The Black Parade||Best International Album||
|-

TRL Awards
The annual TRL Awards were established in 2006 by MTV Italy to honour the year's most popular artists and music videos. My Chemical Romance have won three awards from three nominations.

|-
|align="center" rowspan="2"|2006||rowspan="2"|My Chemical Romance||Best Group that Actually Plays Instruments||
|-
|Best New Artist||
|-
|align="center"|2007||My Chemical Romance||Best Band||
|-

UK Festival Awards
The UK Festival Awards are awarded annually, with various categories for all aspects of festivals that have taken place in the UK, and one category for European festivals. The awards were first established in 2004, and are produced by virtualfestivals.com. My Chemical Romance have received one nomination.

|-
|align="center"|2011||My Chemical Romance||Best Headline Performance||
|-

References

Awards
Lists of awards received by American musician
Lists of awards received by musical group